The Name of Mary Church is a Roman Catholic church in Bosanska Krupa, Bosnia and Herzegovina.

References 

Bosanska Krupa
Bosanska Krupa